The Australian Railways Union (ARU) was an Australian trade union in existence from 1920 to 1993. The ARU was an industrial union, representing all types of workers employed in the rail industry, excluding locomotive enginedrivers and tradesmen in craft areas.

History

It was formed in September 1920, through the amalgamation of state-based unions in Queensland, New South Wales, Victoria, South Australia and Tasmania, and was federally registered as a union on 8 February 1921. It merged with three other public transport unions in 1993 to form the Australian Rail Tram and Bus Industry Union.

References

Defunct trade unions of Australia
1920 establishments in Australia
Trade unions established in 1920
Trade unions disestablished in 1993
1993 disestablishments in Australia
Railway unions in Australia